Button Bay State Park is a 253-acre state park in Ferrisburgh, Vermont on the shore of Lake Champlain.

Activities includes boating, swimming, camping, fishing, hiking, picnicking, wildlife watching, water sports and winter sports.

Facilities include a swimming pool with lifeguards, canoe and kayak rentals, a large picnic shelter and picnic areas, a play area, 73 campsites including 13 lean-tos and 4 cabins, flush toilets, hot showers, and a dump station.

The park includes the Button Point Natural Area, a 14-acre site including the 2-acre Button Island and an 8-acre peninsula with a mature forest stand. The park's nature center is located here, and park rangers offer interpretive programs including night hikes, campfire programs, amphibian explorations, and nature crafts and games.

See also
Button Bay

References

External links

State parks of Vermont
Protected areas of Addison County, Vermont
Ferrisburgh, Vermont
Nature centers in Vermont
Lake Champlain
1964 establishments in Vermont